Royton Junction railway station was a station on the Oldham Loop Line in Greater Manchester, England. It opened on 1 July 1864, and was the junction for the short branch line to Royton railway station. The line to Royton was closed to goods on 2 November 1964, and to passengers on 16 April 1966. A 450-yard section of the line remained in use for freight traffic from Royton Junction to Higginshaw Gas Sidings. This final part of the Royton Junction to Royton line closed on 6 April 1970.

The station was renamed Royton on 8 May 1978, and was closed from 11 May 1987.

References

Disused railway stations in the Metropolitan Borough of Oldham
Former Lancashire and Yorkshire Railway stations
Railway stations in Great Britain opened in 1864
Railway stations in Great Britain closed in 1987
1864 establishments in England
1987 disestablishments in England